The 2019–20 South Florida Bulls men's basketball team represents the University of South Florida during the 2019–20 NCAA Division I men's basketball season. The season marks the 48th basketball season for USF, the seventh as a member of the American Athletic Conference, and the third season under head coach Brian Gregory. The Bulls play their home games at Yuengling Center on the university's Tampa, Florida campus.

Previous season
The Bulls finished the 2018–19 season 24–14, 8–10 in AAC play to finish in a tie for seventh place. As the No. 8 seed in the AAC tournament, they lost in the first round to Connecticut. They were invited to participate in the College Basketball Invitational where they defeated Stony Brook, Utah Valley, and Loyola Marymount to advance to the best-of-three finals series against DePaul. After losing in game 1, they won games 2 and 3 to become CBI champions.

Offseason

Departures

2019 recruiting class

2020 recruiting class

Roster 

Nov 4, 2019 - Alexis Yetna suffered a knee injury, leading him to sit out for the entire season.

Schedule and results

|-
!colspan=9 style=| Exhibition

|-
!colspan=9 style=| Non-Conference regular season

|-
!colspan=9 style=| AAC Regular Season

|-
!colspan=9 style=| AAC tournament

Source
1.Cancelled due to the Coronavirus Pandemic

References

South Florida Bulls men's basketball seasons
South Florida Bulls
South Florida Bulls men's b
South Florida Bulls men's b